The Amazonian inezia or Amazonian tyrannulet (Inezia subflava) is a species of bird in the family Tyrannidae. It is found in Bolivia, Brazil, Colombia, and Venezuela. Its natural habitats are subtropical or tropical dry forests, subtropical or tropical moist lowland forests, and heavily degraded former forest.

References

Amazonian inezia
Birds of the Amazon Basin
Amazonian inezia
Amazonian inezia
Amazonian inezia
Birds of Brazil
Taxonomy articles created by Polbot